St Bride's Church, Canning, Liverpool, England, is a Church of England parish church.

History and architecture
St Bride's was designed by Samuel Rowland. Building work started on 29 August 1829 and was the church consecrated on 29 December 1830. It was built for the Reverend James Haldane Stewart and is a Grade II* listed building.

It is deemed the best surviving Neoclassical church in Liverpool. It is temple-like in appearance and has a monumental portico of six unfluted Ionic columns across the west end. The east window is of stained glass in a Renaissance style and was installed in about 1905. In the chancel there is a monument to Rev Mr Stewart who died in 1854. There is another monument to Mr WM Foster, his wife and servant, who all drowned in the wreck of the steamship  in 1831.

Present day
The building has hosted several events as part of the Liverpool Biennial art festival.

See also
Architecture of Liverpool

References

Sources

External links

St Bride's Liverpool – official website

Anglican Diocese of Liverpool
Church of England church buildings in Merseyside
Churches in Liverpool
Church of St Bride
Grade II* listed churches in Merseyside